Kanchari is a community in Andhra Pradesh, also known as Kanchara, Kanchera and Musarlu.

The community's name is derived from kanchu (bronze) and their traditional profession was bronze-making. They are part of Viswakarma group. They are classified as a Backward Class in India's system of positive discrimination.

See also
 Telugu castes

References

Social groups of Andhra Pradesh